The 2019 Princeton Tigers football team represented Princeton University in the 2019 NCAA Division I FCS football season. They were led by tenth-year head coach Bob Surace and played their home games at Powers Field at Princeton Stadium. Princeton played as a member of the Ivy League. They finished the season 8–2 overall and 5–2 in Ivy League play to place third. Princeton averaged 9,605 fans per game.

Previous season

The Tigers finished the 2018 season 10–0, 7–0 in Ivy League play to win the Ivy League title.

Preseason

Preseason media poll
The Ivy League released their preseason media poll on August 8, 2019. The Tigers were picked to finish in third place.

Schedule

Game summaries

Butler

at Bucknell

Columbia

Lafayette

at Brown

Harvard

at Cornell

vs. Dartmouth

Yale

at Penn

Rankings

References

Princeton
Princeton Tigers football seasons
Princeton Tigers football